James Phillips was a Scottish footballer who played as a half back.

Career
Phillips played club football for Queen's Park, and made three appearances for Scotland. He won the Scottish Cup twice with Queen's Park and was elected a life member of the club in 1879.

References

Year of birth missing
Place of birth missing
Scottish footballers
Scotland international footballers
Queen's Park F.C. players
Association football wing halves
Year of death missing
Place of death missing